Dhenkanal is a town and a municipality in Dhenkanal district in the state of Odisha, India.

Geography
It has an average elevation of 80 metres (262 feet).

Demographics
As per the 2011 India census, Dhenkanal had a population of 67,414. Males constitute 53% of the population and females 47%. Dhenkanal has an average literacy rate of 79%, higher than the national average of 59.5%. Male literacy is 84% and female literacy is 74%. In Dhenkanal, 10% of the population is under 6 years of age.

Notable people
 Amiya Kumari Padhi, High Court judge
 Baishnab Charan Patnaik, member of Parliament
 Nandini Satpathy
Suparno Satpathy
Kamakhya Prasad Singh Deo
 Devendra Satpathy
 Gati Krushna Misra
 Tathagata Satpathy
 Kalpana Dash

References

External links

 

Cities and towns in Dhenkanal district